The 1910–11 Auburn Tigers men's basketball team represented Auburn University during the 1910–11 college basketball season. The head coach was Mike Donahue, coaching his sixth season with the Tigers.

Schedule

|-

References

Auburn Tigers men's basketball seasons
Auburn
Auburn Tigers men's basketball team
Auburn Tigers men's basketball team